The University of Surrey is a public research university in Guildford, Surrey, England. The university received its royal charter in 1966, along with a number of other institutions following recommendations in the Robbins Report. The institution was previously known as Battersea College of Technology and was located in Battersea Park, London. Its roots however, go back to Battersea Polytechnic Institute, founded in 1891 to provide further and higher education in London, including its poorer inhabitants.

The university is a member of the Association of MBAs and is one of four universities in the University Global Partnership Network. It is also part of the SETsquared partnership along with the University of Bath, the University of Bristol, the University of Southampton, and the University of Exeter. The university's main campus is on Stag Hill, close to the centre of Guildford and adjacent to Guildford Cathedral. Surrey Sports Park is situated at the nearby Manor Park, the university's secondary campus. Among British universities, the University of Surrey had the 41st highest average UCAS Tariff for new entrants in 2020.

A major centre for satellite and mobile communications research, the university is in partnership with King's College London and the Dresden University of Technology to develop 5G technology worldwide. It also holds a number of formal links with institutions worldwide, including the Surrey International Institute, launched in partnership with the Dongbei University of Finance and Economics. The university owns the Surrey Research Park, providing facilities for over 110 companies engaged in research. Surrey has been awarded three Queen's Anniversary Prizes for its research, with the 2021 Research Excellence Framework seeing the university rise 12 places to 33rd in the UK for overall research quality and 41% of the university's research outputs classified as "world leading". It was named The Sunday Times University of the Year in 2016, was nominated again for the same accolade in 2023, and was The Sunday Times University of the Year for Graduate Employment in 2022.

The chancellor of the university is Prince Edward, Duke of Kent. Current and emeritus academics at the university include ten Fellows of the Royal Society, twenty-one Fellows of the Royal Academy of Engineering, one Fellow of the British Academy and six Fellows of the Academy of Social Sciences. Surrey has educated many notable alumni, including Olympic gold medallists, several senior politicians, as well as a number of notable persons in various fields including the arts, sports and academia. Graduates typically abbreviate the University of Surrey to Sur when using post-nominal letters after their degree.

History

Foundation and early period

The University of Surrey was preceded by the Battersea Polytechnic Institute which was founded in 1891 and admitted its first students in 1894. Its aim was to provide greater access to further and higher education for Londoners, including some of the city's  "poorer inhabitants". In 1901, evening classes provided instruction in  subjects such as Mechanical Engineering and Building, Electrical Engineering, Chemical and other trades, Physics and Natural Science, Maths, Languages, Commercial subjects, Music and special classes for women including Domestic Economy subjects. Day classes consisted of Art, Science, Women's Subjects and Gymnastics, and classes were also offered in preparation for university and professional examinations. The institute focused on science and technology subjects, and from about 1920 taught University of London students, awarding University of London external degrees.

In 1956, the institute was among the first to receive the designation "College of Advanced Technology" and was renamed Battersea College of Technology. By the beginning of the sixties, the college had virtually outgrown its building in Battersea and had decided to move to Guildford. In addition to this, the Robbins Report of 1963 proposed that the Colleges of Advanced Technology, including Battersea, should expand and become degree-awarding universities. In 1965, the university-designate acquired a greenfield site in Guildford from Guildford Cathedral, Guildford Borough Council and the Onslow Village Trust.

University status

On 9 September 1966 the University of Surrey was established by Royal Charter and by 1970 the move from Battersea to Guildford was complete. On the day before the installation ceremony of the first Chancellor of the university, the Aberfan disaster occurred. Alfred Robens, Baron Robens of Woldingham who was appointed the first Chancellor, was also the chairman of the National Coal Board, and as such was expected to visit the site of the disaster. Robens decided instead to continue with the ceremony in Guildford to become Chancellor. During this transient period, visitors to the Battersea campus on 25 October 1968 saw Led Zeppelin perform their very first gig, advertised as being at the university's Victorian "Great Hall, Battersea Park Road".

The university's Battersea Court consists of halls of residence which were named in honour of the university's Battersea origins.

Between 1982 and 2008, the university became the trustee of the building of the Guildford Institute, using parts of the building for its adult education programme and providing a university presence in the heart of Guildford. The Assessment and Qualifications Alliance (formerly Associated Examining Board) moved from Aldershot to its own headquarters building on the Stag Hill campus in 1985. The university marked its Silver Jubilee in 1991, an event celebrated by the publishing of Surrey – The Rise of a Modern University by Roy Douglas and by a Service of Thanksgiving in Guildford Cathedral attended by HM The Queen in March 1992.

In 1998, due to the ongoing development in the relationship between the university and the nearby Roehampton Institute, it was decided to form an academic federation. In November 1999, the Privy Council approved the necessary changes to the university's Charter and Statutes and the Roehampton Institute became the University of Surrey Roehampton at the beginning of 2000. Between 2000 and 2004, the university and Roehampton worked together as the Federal University of Surrey. In June 2004, the Privy Council granted Roehampton an independent university title, and it became Roehampton University from 1 August 2004, ending the federal partnership between the institutions.

The university celebrated its 35th anniversary in May 2002 with a major event in Guildford Cathedral. It was also marked by the unveiling of The Surrey Scholar sculpture (by Allan Sly FBS) to mark the Golden Jubilee of Her Majesty The Queen and as a gift to the people of Guildford. The Surrey Scholar is at the bottom of Guildford High Street. Understanding the Real World, a visual history of the university, by Christopher Pick, was published to coincide with this anniversary. In 2007, the university saw a major increase in overall applications by 39% compared with the previous year. This was followed by a further increase in applications of 12% in 2008. In October 2008, the university lost out to Royal Holloway in a bid to merge with London medical institute St George's, University of London. From September 2009, the Guildford School of Acting became a subsidiary of the university and relocated from Guildford town centre to the university campus.

In March 2019 the university announced it would have to make £15m worth of cuts owing to the effects of Brexit and anticipated cuts in tuition fees, and was offering redundancy to all staff. Following the announcement, The Stag, published an article titled 'Paygate: The Problem with Surrey's Vice-Chancellor', in which it compared Vice-Chancellor Max Lu's "performance-related bonuses" to the university's actual performance. Soon after, in May 2019, staff and students held a no confidence vote against the university management, with coverage largely focused on Lu's leadership. Of all the unionised staff who voted, 96% gave a vote of no confidence in "the Vice-Chancellor and Executive Board". The all-staff vote was approved by all three trade unions represented at the university, in a meeting held with the largest member attendance seen. Concerns raised by staff specifically include "Lu's language which suggests staff are a cost rather than an asset", according to the University and College Union, while the Students' Union was specifically concerned about the closure of many arts courses at the university despite a "healthy" number of applications for them. Students who wanted a "no" vote hoped this result would make the university management "engage with staff and students and discuss changes".

Buildings and sites

Main sites

The university began moving in 1968 to a new  site on Stag Hill in Guildford, adjacent to Guildford Cathedral. Students continued to alternate between the original Battersea campus and the new Guildford campus until 1970. A further  allocated to the university remained undeveloped until 2005. The BBC's local radio station for Surrey and North-East Hampshire, BBC Surrey, has its studios on the campus. In addition the university has a student-run medium wave radio station, Stag Radio. In September 2009, the Guildford School of Acting moved into a new purpose-built facility on the main Stag Hill campus as part of a strategic merger between the two organisations. The old Sports Centre was converted into the Ivy Arts Centre, a performing arts facility housing a 200-seat theatre and studio and workshop space. In October 2015, the £45m School of Veterinary Medicine was opened by the Queen accompanied by the Duke of Edinburgh. It combines residences for students and staff, buildings for research and teaching, and sporting facilities.

Sports facilities

In April 2010, a £36 million sports centre named the Surrey Sports Park opened to replace the former UniSport facilities on the Stag Hill Campus. Surrey Sports Park is situated close to the main University campus, on its Manor Park site. It houses a 50-metre swimming pool, three multi-sports halls, six squash courts, a modern gym, three artificial floodlit pitches, outdoor tennis courts, a climbing centre and a coffee shop, bar and restaurant.

The 1,000 seat indoor arena is home to Surrey Scorchers basketball team (formerly Guildford Heat, Surrey Heat and Surrey United), who have been using the venue since 2010 following a move from their previous home at Guildford Spectrum. Surrey Scorchers are one of the leading teams and former winners of the British Basketball League, the country's top division. It also plays host to Surrey Storm netball (formerly Brunel Hurricanes), who also made the move to the Sports Park from Guildford Spectrum in 2010. Surrey Storm are two-time Netball Superleague champions, securing their last title with a 55–53 win over Manchester Thunder at London's Copper Box Arena in the 2016 Grand Final. It played host to all but four matches of the 2010 Women's Rugby World Cup (the semi finals, third place play off and final were held at the Twickenham Stoop). It is also the official training facility for Harlequins rugby club, playing host to their Men's and Women's first teams plus Academy fixtures, and was used as a training base for the 2015 Rugby World Cup, hosting a number of teams including South Africa, Scotland and Italy.

2012 saw Surrey Sports Park host a number of Olympic and Paralympic teams in preparation for the London 2012 Olympic Games, including delegations from across the globe for swimming, table tennis, basketball and triathlon camps. In 2013, Surrey Sports Park hosted the annual Danone Nations Cup junior football tournament, with fixtures being played on the outdoor pitches through to the finals at Wembley Stadium. In 2017, Surrey Sports Park hosted the Women's Lacrosse World Cup, with over 25 nations competing for the world title in Guildford. All matches took place at the venue, including the finals, with a temporary outdoor stadium erected for the 10-day event.

Organisation

Structure 
The academic activities of the university are divided into the following three faculties:

Faculty of Arts & Social Sciences
 School of Economics 
 School of Hospitality and Tourism Management
 School of Law
 School of Literature and Languages
 Department of Music and Media
 Department of Politics
 Department of Sociology
 Surrey Business School
 Guildford School of Acting

Faculty of Engineering and Physical Sciences
 Department of Chemistry
 Department of Chemical and Process Engineering
 Department of Civil and Environmental Engineering
 Department of Computer Science
 Department of Electrical and Electronic Engineering
 Department of Mathematics
 Department of Mechanical Engineering Sciences 
 Department of Physics 
 Centre for Environment and Sustainability

Faculty of Health and Medical Sciences
 School of Biosciences and Medicine
 School of Health Sciences
 School of Psychology
 School of Veterinary Medicine

Governance

Prince Edward, Duke of Kent was installed as Chancellor, a ceremonial non-residential post, in 1977. The university is led at the executive level by the President and Vice-Chancellor,  Max Lu. The key bodies in the university governance structure are the council, Senate and executive board. The council is the governing body of the university, responsible for the overall planning and management of the university and to ensure processes are in place to monitor financial and operational controls, and the university's performance against its strategy. The council is composed of no fewer than eleven external members, up to seven ex-officio members and up to three members elected by Senate.

The Senate is the statutory body responsible for governing the university's academic matters, including teaching and research, and the regulation and direction of the education and conduct of students. The composition of the Senate is drawn from the academic staff of the university, together with a number of ex-officio, elected and co-opted members. The Chair of the Senate is the President and Vice-Chancellor of the university. The executive board is the senior advisory body that assists the President and Vice-Chancellor in discharging his executive authority to manage the operations and affairs of the university. It is responsible for advising on all matters relating to the university's strategy and for making recommendations to Council for approval. The above Bodies are supported by a series of Committees that oversee the activities of distinctive administrative and academic areas of the university.

On 3 December 2015 it was announced that Max Lu would become the university's fifth President and Vice-Chancellor, taking up his appointment in April 2016. He succeeded Sir Christopher Snowden who moved to take up the Vice-Chancellorship at the University of Southampton in September 2015. Sir Christopher joined Surrey on 1 July 2005. His predecessors are Patrick J. Dowling (1994–2005), Anthony Kelly (1975–1994) and Peter Leggett, the last Principal of Battersea College of Technology and the university's first Vice-Chancellor.

Educational links 
Since its foundation, the university has fostered links with other educational bodies in the local community and region. The university currently validates undergraduate courses at Farnborough College of Technology and postgraduate research programmes at St Mary's University, Twickenham for students entering prior to August 2014.

In 2007, the university and Dongbei University of Finance and Economics in Dalian, China, launched the Surrey International Institute, DUFE. The SII at DUFE offers Surrey degrees and dual-degree programmes in China. A placement year link with North Carolina State University was initiated in 2009, where each institution places students from the other with companies located nearby, in the South East of England and the Carolinas, respectively.

The university holds a number of formal links with institutions from around the world to share teaching and research and facilitate staff and student exchanges.
  University of São Paulo, Brazil
  Seoul National University, South Korea
  University of Central Florida, USA
  University of Punjab
  North Carolina State University, USA
  The DUFE—Surrey International Institute (东北财经大学萨里国际学院) is an academic partnership with the Dongbei University of Finance and Economics in Dalian, China
  University of Hong Kong
  Nanyang Technological University
  National Autonomous University of Mexico Head Associate; Diego Luiz.
  Modul University Vienna, Austria

Academic profile

Research 

The university conducts extensive research on small satellites, with its Surrey Space Centre and spin-off commercial company, Surrey Satellite Technology Ltd. In the 2001 Research Assessment Exercise, the University of Surrey received a 5* rating in the categories of "Sociology", "Other Studies and Professions Allied to Medicine", and "Electrical and Electronic Engineering"
and a 5* rating in the categories of "Psychology", "Physics", "Applied Mathematics", "Statistics and Operational Research", "European Studies" and "Russian, Slavonic and East European Languages".

The 5G Innovation Centre (5GIC) at the University of Surrey opened in September 2015, for the purpose of research for the development of the first worldwide 5G network. It has gained over £40m support from international telecommunications companies including Aeroflex, MYCOM OSI, BBC, BT Group, EE (telecommunications company), Fujitsu Laboratories of Europe, Huawei, Ofcom, Rohde & Schwarz, Samsung, Telefonica and Vodafone – and a further £11.6m from the Higher Education Funding Council for England (HEFCE).

In addition, the Surrey Research Park is a  low density development which is owned and developed by the university, providing large landscaped areas with water features and facilities for over 110 companies engaged in a broad spectrum of research, development and design activities. The university generates the third highest endowment income out of all UK universities "reflecting its commercially-orientated heritage."

Admissions 

New students entering the university in 2015 had the 14th highest UCAS Points in the UK at 438 points (the equivalent of AAB at A Level and BB at AS Level). According to the 2017 Times and Sunday Times Good University Guide, approximately 8% of Surrey's undergraduates come from independent schools.

For the 2016–17 academic year, the university has a higher proportion of female than male students with a male to female ratio of 45:55 in the population. The undergraduate student body is composed of 73% from the UK, 11% from the EU and 16% from outside of the EU. More students graduate from Surrey with a First Class Honours degree (44.4%) than with a 2:1 degree (40.9%), placing it second amongst mainstream British universities by the proportion of First Class degrees awarded.

Reputation and rankings 

The university has consistently been in the top 60 of the three main ranking compilations of universities in the United Kingdom, placing it 39th in The Times and Sunday Times, 34th in The Good University Guide and the Complete University Guide, and 54th in The Guardian University Guide for 2021. International rankings have seen a steady improvement over the past five years. Subjects ranked in the top 20 include Hospitality & Leisure Management and Petroleum engineering. The university was ranked seventh in the Times Higher Education Student Experience Survey 2018. In 2019, Surrey was ranked 161-170th in the QS World Employability Rankings, and first in the UK and 12th in the world for research partnerships with employers .

In 1991 the university was granted the Queen's Award for Export Achievement, and in 1996 was awarded a Queen's Anniversary Prize for Higher & Further Education in recognition of the university's outstanding achievement in satellite engineering and communications, teaching and research by the Centre for Satellite Engineering Research and associated companies. In 1998, Surrey Satellite Technology Ltd was awarded the Queen's Award for Technological Achievement, presented in person by the Queen on her second visit to the university, accompanied by the Duke of Edinburgh and the Duke of Kent, chancellor of the university.

The university was awarded a 2002 Queen's Anniversary Prize for Higher & Further Education for its research and development on optoelectronic devices and ion beam applications. In July 2007, the university was awarded Fairtrade University status by the Fairtrade Foundation. The university won a 2011 Queen's Anniversary Prize for Higher & Further Education for its research into the fields of safe water and sanitation. In 2013, the Electronic Engineering Department of the university won the 2013 Elektra Award University Department of the Year, and judged to be the most innovative and successful in Europe. In 2016 the university won The Sunday Times University of the Year award. The university won a 2017 Queen's Anniversary Prize for Higher & Further Education for "Leading research and teaching in food and nutrition informing public policy on diabetes, obesity, osteoporosis and other dietary related issues".

Notable academics and alumni

Notable alumni

Notable academics

Academics to work at the university include Alf Adams, pioneer of the strained quantum-well laser; Jim Al-Khalili, the nuclear physicist, author and broadcaster; Aleks Krotoski, the technology journalist and broadcaster; Sir Martin Sweeting, founder of Surrey Satellite Technology Ltd; Nigel Gilbert, the sociologist pioneer in the use of agent-based models in the social sciences;, Joao Santos Silva, who has made fundamental contributions to the gravity model of trade, and Martyn Barrett, who led the development of the Council of Europe's Reference Framework of Competences for Democratic Culture and is a lead expert for the Council of Europe's Education Policy Advisers Network.

The current Director of the university's Advanced Technology Institute, Ravi Silva, is known for his work in Nanotechnology. In 2003, he was awarded the Albert Einstein Silver Medal and the Javed Husain Prize by UNESCO for contributions to electronic devices. The 2011 Clifford Paterson Lecture was given by Silva because of his outstanding contributions to basic science and engineering in the field of carbon nanoscience and nanotechnology. The lecture is given annually on any aspect of engineering. The General Electric Company Limited endowed the lecture in 1975 in honour of Clifford Paterson who undertook the creation of the GEC Research Laboratories in 1919. Other notable academics who have delivered the lecture include Frank Kelly and Richard Friend, both from the University of Cambridge.

Surrey's Centre for Environment and Sustainability (established by Roland Clift in 1992 as the Centre for Environmental Strategy) gained attention with the publication of Prosperity Without Growth in 2009 by University of Surrey academic Tim Jackson, Professor of Sustainable Development and Director of the ESRC Research Group on Lifestyles, Values and Environment. In October 2018 the University of Surrey reported that writer and filmmaker Iain Sinclair had been appointed Distinguished Writer in Residence with their School of Literature and Languages.

On 20 May 2009, Andreas Mogensen, a researcher at the Surrey Space Centre, was announced as a new member of the European Astronaut Corps, part of the European Space Agency, thereby becoming the first Danish astronaut. In February 2011, terrorism and Northern Ireland expert Marie Breen Smyth, joined the politics department, as chair in International Relations. In March 2005, she had given evidence to the House of Commons Northern Ireland Affairs Committee Inquiry into dealing with Northern Ireland's past. Another notable academic was the late translation studies scholar Peter Newmark.

Student life

Students' Union 

The University of Surrey Students' Union is the sole representative body of Surrey students. They represent students on academic and welfare issues, as well as administering sports clubs and societies. The Union was incorporated as a non-profit charity in July 2011, so any takings from the Union's four commercial outlets are invested in supporting the membership side of the business. Four zones exist within the organisation representing Support, Voice, Community and Activity, with a sabbatical officer managing each one, as well as a president who is a member of the University Council. The Students' Union also organise events on a weekly basis which are held at their venues including Rubix and The Basement for students to take part in.

In 2017 the university was specifically identified in the report by the Free Speech University Rankings as having "unfamiliar" restrictions on free speech because of a collection of its union byelaws regarding university mascot Steve the Stag: the mascot is not allowed to be depicted by students to be drinking, smoking or, as the report and subsequent articles directly quote, "involved in lewd acts".
Subsequent editions of the Students' Union Byelaws contained a further explanatory note for this.

Media
StagTV is the television station run by students at the University of Surrey. It is primarily run from offices on the main Stag Hill campus and it also creates content for the Students' Union, through which it is a constituted group, but has editorial independence. Other student media on campus include Stag Radio and The Stag.

See also
 Armorial of UK universities
 College of advanced technology (United Kingdom)
 Lewis Elton Gallery
 List of public art in Surrey
 List of universities in the UK

References

External links 

University of Surrey Students' Union – official website
Guildford School of Acting – official website
Our History University of Surrey

 
Educational institutions established in 1891
1891 establishments in England
Universities UK